RTJ may refer to:

 Rivera Triple Junction, on the  Pacific seafloor 
 Rodrigues Triple Junction, in the southern Indian Ocean
 Robert Trent Jones Golf Club, Gainesville, Virginia, US
 Run the Jewels, a US musical duo